The Uruguay national rugby sevens team participates at the World Rugby and Sudamérica Rugby tournaments for rugby sevens national teams.

Uruguay won the Sudamérica Rugby Sevens in 2012, and was runner-up six times. The team was fourth at both the 2011 and 2015 Pan American Games.

Uruguay played six rounds of the inaugural 1999–2000 World Sevens Series, scoring series points at the 2000 Punta del Este Sevens and 2000 Fiji Sevens.

They participated in the 2014 Hong Kong Sevens World Series Qualifier, reaching the quarterfinals after finishing second in their pool, but lost to Russia 21-14. At the 2015 Hong Kong Sevens World Series Qualifier, they claimed wins over Brazil and Mexico and losses to Hong Kong and Papua New Guinea. The team did not qualify to the 2016 Hong Kong Sevens. The team participated in the 2018 World Series Qualifier at the 2018 Hong Kong Sevens. 

Uruguay qualified for the 2018 Rugby World Cup Sevens after winning the regional qualifiers at the 2018 Sudamérica Rugby Sevens. They finished in 20th place after losing to Uganda.

They became a core team for the 2022–23 World Rugby Sevens Series having qualified after winning the 2022 World Rugby Sevens Challenger Series in Chile.

World Rugby Series

World Rugby Sevens Challenger Series

Tournament history

Pan American Games

Rugby World Cup Sevens

Players

Former squads
Squad to 2015 Hong Kong Sevens.

Gabriel Puig (C)					
Nicolás Freitas					
Leandro Leivas				
Guillermo Lijstenstein					
Rodrigo Silva					
Tomás Jolivet					
Santiago Gibernau					
Alejo Durán					
Ian Schmidt					
Joaquín Prada					
Alfonso Falcón					
Sebastián Schroeder

References

Rugby union in Uruguay
sevens
National rugby sevens teams